Fareham Common is a suburb and small village near Fareham, Hampshire. The village lies 1.3 miles (2.8 km) north from the town of Fareham. The suburb is only made up of a few industrial estates.

Fareham
Villages in Hampshire